The 1942 Michigan gubernatorial election was held on November 3, 1942. Republican nominee Harry Kelly defeated incumbent Democrat Murray Van Wagoner with 52.60% of the vote.

General election

Candidates
Major party candidates
Harry Kelly, Republican
Murray Van Wagoner, Democratic
Other candidates
Frederic S. Goodrich, Prohibition

Results

Primaries 
The primary elections occurred on September 15, 1942.

Republican primary

Democratic primary

References

1942
Michigan
Gubernatorial
November 1942 events